Nobody's Baby is a 1937 American comedy film directed by Gus Meins and written by Harold Law, Hal Yates and Pat C. Flick. The film stars Patsy Kelly, Lyda Roberti, Lynne Overman, Robert Armstrong, Rosina Lawrence, and Don Alvarado. The film was released on April 23, 1937 by Metro-Goldwyn-Mayer.

Plot
Patsy and Lyda function essentially as a female Laurel and Hardy. After both fail to land jobs in radio, they end up rooming together. Patsy decides to become a nurse and Lyda follows; they actually fare somewhat better in these jobs. Along the way, they strike up chaste romances with a laconic detective (Overman) and a self-described hot-shot newspaperman (Armstrong). The plot finally rears its head with the arrival of an adagio dance team called Cortez and Yvonne (Alvarado and Lawrence). They're secretly married, but she leaves him in a huff after he insists on keeping it quiet—he doesn't know she's pregnant. Months later, she gives birth in the hospital where Patsy and Lyda work. They convince her to reconcile with Cortez and give him the news; she agrees, prevailing upon them to keep an eye on the baby. And then things really start to get out of hand.

Cast 
Patsy Kelly as Kitty Reilly
Lyda Roberti as Lena Marchetti
Lynne Overman as Det. Lt. Emory Littleworth
Robert Armstrong as Scoops Hanford
Rosina Lawrence as	Yvonne Cortez
Don Alvarado as Tony Cortez
Jimmy Grier and His Orchestra as Jimmy Grier and His Orchestra
Tom Dugan as Bus Conductor
Orrin Burke as Maurice 
Dora Clement as Miss Margaret McKenzie
Laura Treadwell as Mrs. Hamilton
Ottola Nesmith as Head Nurse
Florence Roberts as Mrs. Mason 
Si Wills as Nightclub MC
Herbert Rawlinson as Radio Audition Executive
Rhythm Rascals as Vocal Trio 
Chill Wills as Amateur Hour Lead Quartet Singer
Don Brookins as Amateur Hour Quartet Singer 
Art Green as Amateur Hour Quartet Singer 
Walter Trask as Amateur Hour Quartet Singer

References

External links

1937 films
American comedy films
1937 comedy films
Metro-Goldwyn-Mayer films
Films directed by Gus Meins
American black-and-white films
1930s English-language films
1930s American films